James Austin Copland Mackie (1924–2011), known as Jamie Mackie, was an Australian academic, described by The Australian as one of the country's "pioneers of its post-war engagement with Asia"  and by The Age as having had a "distinguished academic career to the study of post-colonial south-east Asia." Born in Kandy to the Australian manager of a tea plantation, he studied in Melbourne and Oxford before working "with the Colombo Plan in Jakarta from 1956 to 1958, working with the newly established National Planning Bureau." He taught at the University of Melbourne (1958–1967) and Monash University (1968–1978) and edited the ASAA Review. He is also credited with playing a major role in the dismantling of the White Australia policy, which severely restricted non-White migration.  After his death, the J.A.C. Mackie Memorial Endowment was established by the Australian National University to fund travel scholarships to Southeast Asia for undergraduate or graduate students.

References

External links 

 Jamie Mackie interviewed by Ann Moyal for National Library of Australia Oral History Project

1924 births
2011 deaths
Australian political scientists
Academic staff of the University of Melbourne
Academic staff of Monash University
Academic staff of the Australian National University